The Fabulous Five may refer to:

 Fabulous Five Inc., a Jamaican reggae band
 The Fabulous Five (book series), a series of novels for teenagers by American author Betsy Haynes
 The Fabulous 5, legendary 1970s New York City graffiti crew including Fab Five Freddy and Lee Quiñones
 Fabulous Five (Kentucky Wildcats), nickname of the 1947–1948 University of Kentucky men's basketball team
 The Fabulous Five, the nickname of the Iowa Hawkeyes men's basketball team in the 1950s
The Fabulous Five, a group of Disney characters consisting of Mickey Mouse, Minnie Mouse, Pluto, Goofy, and Donald Duck. This group is also called The Sensational Six, when Daisy Duck is included.

See also
Fab Five (disambiguation)